House Nunatak is one of the Grossman Nunataks in Palmer Land, Antarctica, located  southeast of Whitmill Nunatak. It was named by the Advisory Committee on Antarctic Names after John R. House Jr., a United States Geological Survey cartographer who worked in the field at South Pole Station and Byrd Station, 1972–73.

References

Nunataks of Palmer Land